Gummy Song Skull is an EP released by The Flaming Lips as part of the Flaming Lips 2011 series of monthly music releases. This was a limited release contained on a USB keydrive and placed inside a brain-shaped gummy which was further encased in a gummy skull. The EP was only sold in a few record stores in the US, at a price of $150. It has yet to be officially released on any other format.

Track listing

Personnel
Wayne Coyne
Steven Drozd
Michael Ivins
Kliph Scurlock
Derek Brown

References

The Flaming Lips EPs
Warner Records EPs
2011 EPs